Mystery P.I.: The Lottery Ticket is a hidden object game, created by Canadian studio SpinTop Games. The title is published by PopCap Games. The object of the game is to find a lottery ticket belonging to the player character's grandmother. When it is found, the player character is rewarded with over 400 million dollars in prize money. Before that, the player must find various hidden objects and solve various clues which all relate to the lottery ticket.

References

External links
 Official Mystery P.I.: The Lottery Ticket Homepage
 SpinTop Games

2007 video games
PopCap games
Puzzle video games
Video games developed in Canada
Windows games
Windows-only games
Detective video games
Hidden object games

Single-player video games
Works about lotteries